Monsieur Linh and His Child is a novella by French author Philippe Claudel, originally published in French in 2005.

Monsier Linh is a South-East Asian — probably Vietnamese — refugee to France. His son and daughter-in-law were killed in an unspecified war, and he has fled to France with his infant granddaughter, Sang Diû.  Despite the language barrier, he befriends the widower Monsieur Bark, whom he meets on a park bench.

References

External links
 Official page at Maclehose's website

2005 French novels
Novels by Philippe Claudel